Readly AB is a Swedish digital newspaper and magazine subscription service with content from over 800 third-party publishers, available via browser and mobile app for a monthly fee.

As of December 2019, a total of 5000 titles were available on Readly's platform. The same year, 14 million issues were read by users in the UK 

The Readly catalog is divided into 30 different categories, including fashion and beauty, science and technology, health and wellness, celebrity and entertainment, lifestyle, luxury, photography, travel, weddings, hobbies, gaming, family and parenting.

Some of the features on Readly include article search, which gives users a shortcut to relevant articles, as well as Readly Exclusives, which are magazines found only on Readly. Curated content is also available via the feature Readly Articles, with selected in-depth reports and interviews presented in a mobile format.

History 
Readly was founded in 2012 by Joel Wikell.

Readly launched in the United Kingdom in 2014 and thereafter in Germany 2015, The Netherlands 2018, Italy 2019, and Australia and New Zealand in 2020.

In March 2018 it was announced that the previous CEO, Per Hellberg, would switch to the position of CEO. The previous CFO Jörgen Gullbrandson replaced him as CEO.

In September 2020, Readly listed its shares on Nasdaq Stockholm Midcap. At this point, the app was available in 50 countries with content in 17 languages. 

In November 2021, Readly acquired Toutabo SA, the French editor of the digital newsstand ePresse.

In February 2022, Mats Brandt was appointed Interim CEO of the company.

References

External Links 
 Readly’s official website

Swedish companies established in 2012
Subscription services
Companies listed on Nasdaq Stockholm
2020 initial public offerings
Internet properties established in 2012